Mog (1663–1724), also called "Chief" Mog, Heracouansit, Warracansit, Warracunsit, or Warrawcuset, was an Abenaki Native American war leader who fought the British in North America during the early 18th century.

Biography 
Mog was the son of Mog, a previous leader of the Abenaki, who was killed in 1677. Mog fought in King William's War and Queen Anne's War as an ally of New France, returning British scalps to Quebec in exchange for payment. After the Treaty of Utrecht, Mog was forced to capitulate, giving the British free passage through their territory. Peace was ended in 1722 when a few Abenaki males attacked Massachusetts, and the Colony of Massachusetts declared war on the Abenaki. Alongside Father Sebastien Rale and Chief Bomoseen, he was killed in the Battle of Norridgewock, shot by a Mohawk soldier allied to the British after failing to kill his son with a musket.

References 
Specific

General
 

People in Father Rale's War
Abenaki people
Native American leaders
1663 births
1724 deaths